International Christian Concern (ICC) is an ecumenical, non-governmental, non-partisan Christian organization, located in Washington, DC, whose concern is the human rights of Christians and religious minorities. Its mission is to help religious minorities from all forms of persecution through assistance, advocacy, and awareness.

History
ICC was founded in 1995 by Steve Snyder, former president of the USA Division of Christian Solidarity International.  In 2002, Snyder was succeeded as ICC President by Jeff King, who had served 11 years with Campus Crusade for Christ.

The organization has issued reports on persecution of Christians in countries such as China, Saudi Arabia, Iraq, and Algeria.  In recent years ICC has also worked to raise the profile of religious persecution in Mexico, Pakistan, Egypt, and India along with individual cases such as Sudanese Christian mother Meriam Ibrahim and Pakistani Christian Asia Bibi.

ICC in 2017 began utilizing the Best Christian Workplaces (BCW) to address complaints from staff regarding toxic cultural issues by the organization's president, Jeff King. These issues ranged from inappropriate HR practices as well as ethical and financial misconduct by the President. A BCW cultural report in 2022 revealed widespread staff support for the President's resignation because of misconduct issues. This led to increased Board involvement, but the Board represents a conflict of interest given that most have prior existing friendships with the President (who also handpicks the Board). As a result, the Board sided with the President and voted to maintain his presence as head of the organization despite the misconduct allegations. As a result of the Board's validation of executive misconduct, most of the organization's staff (over 75%) resigned in 2022.

Mission
International Christian Concern (ICC) works to raise public awareness and provide advocacy for persecuted Christians and other religious minorities around the world. ICC assists victims of religious persecution through direct assistance, awareness, and advocacy initiatives. The organization also assists Congress and the Executive Branch in providing research and evaluation to effectuate policies to safeguard religious freedom.

Areas of focus

Advocacy 
ICC strives to work with various government entities, both domestically and internationally to enact change through the legislative process, pressure countries who persecute Christian minorities, and secure the release of the prisoners of conscience.  
 August, 2012: Saudi Arabia releases 35 Ethiopian Christians arrested at an underground church service in Jeddah after an extensive advocacy campaign.
 August 2013: interview on Fox News Special Report with Brett Baier discussing the torching of 40+ Christian churches in Egypt.
 November 2013: The U.S. designates Boko Haram a "Foreign Terrorist Organization", putting in place economic sanctions and travel bans against the group. 
 March 2014: 70 members of Congress write to President Obama urging him to address human rights and religious freedom in Saudi Arabia. The effort was led by Amnesty International and ICC.
 May 2014: Congressman Trent Franks publishes first Congressional news release of Meriam Ibrahim case.
 June 2014: Protests on behalf of Meriam Ibrahim in front of White House and Sudanese Embassy. Members of Congress, Fox News, Time magazine, and the Huffington Post attend. Secretary John Kerry issues statement condemning imprisonment immediately after the protests.

Awareness 
ICC believes it is vital for both the nation and those globally to become more informed and educated on the very real issue of religious persecution. Through the development of media resources, volunteer efforts, and social media, International Christian Concern has brought the plight of religious minorities to the forefront of many organizations and government entities.

 April 2015: ICC holds first press conference at the National Press Club in Washington D.C. focusing on Pakistan. Speakers included a Congressional member, a member of the British Parliament, Amnesty International, and the attorney for Asia Bibi.
 July 2015: Senator and Presidential candidate Marco Rubio questions Mexican ambassadorial candidate on the continued religious persecution of evangelical Christians in the Mexican states of Chiapas, Hidalgo, and Puebla.
 ICC gave India and its leader a "Persecutor of the Year" award, because persecution has skyrocketed" since 2014 under the leadership of Prime Minister Modi.

ICC publishes an annual "Hall of Shame Report" to highlight countries where discrimination and persecution of Christians is common. In 2016, the United States was placed on the list for the first time and stayed on the list in 2017 due to the decline in religious freedom. In 2021, ICC gave the first "Persecutor of the Year" award, which took the place of the "Hall of Shame Report."

Most of ICC's awareness resources actually go to support building the brand name of the President. This is evident in the website: https://www.jeffkingblog.com/

It is worth noting that this is the same president who is regularly accused by staff of misconduct through external BCW surveys; this includes ethical and financial misconduct.

Assistance 
Assistance refers to practical help and finances ICC offers religious minorities to rebuild, repair, and regroup. ICC continues to provide various forms of donation funded support to persecuted individuals and groups around the globe. Persecution of religious minorities varies beyond the general actions of attacks and imprisonment. ICC provides explanations and opportunities to aid in their effort in 6 unique forms of assistance opportunities.

Publications 
ICC offers a free monthly magazine subscription entitled Persecution.

Top stories, videos and original news releases are located on the organization's website.

Fact Sheet 
ICC has been awarded high marks by charity watchdogs for their efficient and ethical use of financial support and the effectiveness of their work: 
 Charity Navigator, America's premiere independent charity evaluator, works to advance a more efficient and responsive philanthropic marketplace by evaluating the financial health of over 5,300 of America's largest charities. Charity Navigator gave ICC its highest rating (4 stars) again in 2016 based on data from FY 2014.
 ECFA is an accreditation agency dedicated to helping Christian ministries earn the public's trust through adherence to seven Standards of Stewardship, ECFA has given its stamp of approval to ICC.

The Best Christian Workplaces conducts an annual survey of staff to evaluate areas of cultural improvement. The result is three documents. First, an executive summary. Second, data from statistical polling about benefits and other cultural concerns. Third, an open ended question and answer period. This third section is substantial and is where year to year, staff accuse the president of misconduct and ask for his resignation. BCW regularly fails ICC for having a toxic workplace culture and always rates it as one of the worst places to work at in US Christian ministries.

See also

Anti-Christian sentiment
Christian Solidarity International, a Christian human rights NGO
Persecution of Christians
Religious intolerance
Religious persecution
Open Doors, Christian nonprofit organization dedicated to supporting the persecuted church

References

External links
ICC website

International human rights organizations
Persecution of Christians
Religious organizations based in the United States
Christian organizations established in the 20th century
Christian organizations established in 1995